Bucculatrix paroptila is a moth in the family Bucculatricidae. It is found in North America, where it has been recorded from Maine, Massachusetts, Ontario and Nova Scotia. It was described by Annette Frances Braun in 1963.

The larvae feed on Comptonia peregrina and Myrica gale.

References

Natural History Museum Lepidoptera generic names catalog

Bucculatricidae
Moths described in 1963
Moths of North America
Taxa named by Annette Frances Braun